Osiecznica  is a village in the administrative district of Gmina Krosno Odrzańskie, within Krosno Odrzańskie County, Lubusz Voivodeship, in western Poland.

The village has a population of 1,000.

References

Osiecznica